Lindsay Messer (née Monroe) is a fictional character from the CBS crime drama CSI: NY, portrayed by actress Anna Belknap.

Background
Lindsay is a native of Bozeman, Montana. Her western manners, such as removing her shoes before entering a suspect's home, are a novelty to her co-workers. Because of her roots, she is particularly sensitive about cases in which the victim comes from a small town. Ten years prior to her arrival in New York, she was the lone witness and survivor to a multiple homicide in which three of her friends and a waitress were killed (episode 3.12, "Silent Night", episode 3.18, "Sleight Out of Hand").  When she was a child in school, Lindsay was out at a diner with three of her friends. Lindsay escaped what became a massacre at the diner after she had gone into the diner's bathroom. While inside, an armed robber named Daniel Katums entered to rob the patrons and employees. Katums, even after receiving the money, still shot everybody he found inside the diner, not looking for any survivors elsewhere. It was because of this that Lindsay was able to identify Katums. Katums escaped but was arrested after a decade on the run. As the sole survivor, Lindsay was called back to Montana to testify against Katums but was still too traumatized to speak up at first. It seemed without her testimony that Katums might get acquitted, but to Lindsay's happy surprise, Danny Messer who had flown to Montana provided the moral support Lindsay needed to help convict Katums and send him to Montana's death row.  This event both motivates and hinders her as a police investigator. It has left some deep scars; she finds it difficult to talk to mothers of crime victims, and is particularly rattled by the sight of young female murder victims.

In Late Admissions (Season 9), Lindsay returns home to Montana to witness Katums' execution. Lindsay visits Katums to confront him and demanded to know what the cost of all those lives he took was worth it, referring to the proceeds of the robbery. Katums does his best to convince Lindsay he is innocent and that as a child, Lindsay could not offer a proper description of the assailant, but Lindsay of course disregards Katums' plea and, before the lethal injection is administered, Katums finally confesses. It is suggested Lindsay and her father differ on their views on capital punishment with her father asking his daughter what good could be gained from Katums' execution, but Lindsay being flooded with memories of better times with her friends, remains steadfast in seeing Katums pay the ultimate sentence for his crimes. When Lindsay returns to New York, she finds Danny waiting for her on the stoop of their apartment building.

On the job
In her first appearance on the series, it was stated that Monroe had worked as a CSI in Bozeman for three years when she was sought out by crime lab supervisor Mac Taylor to replace the recently dismissed Aiden Burn, whom Mac had fired for tampering with crime-scene evidence. While, according to Stella Bonasera, her dedication and abilities in the lab first drew Mac's notice, she has since proven herself to be a good CSI in the field and also a competent interrogator. Danny called her 'Country Girl' when she exhibited her daring, tomboyish side during her first day at a crime scene. When she took down a much larger fleeing suspect by shoving him into the side of a car, Mac jokingly asked her, "What do they feed you in Montana?" Occasionally, Lindsay has put her life on the line when she believed there was no other alternative, such as going undercover as a jewelry store robber to save the life of a hostage.

Because of her newcomer status during her first few weeks, Monroe was assigned the undesirable tasks such as sifting through tiger dung, recovering evidence from a pool full of personal lubricant, and dumpster diving to recover a discarded shotgun.

Lindsay abruptly leaves a crime scene almost as soon as she arrives in "Silent Night," forcing Stella to cover for her sudden absence. Lindsay is initially tight-lipped about her actions to Stella, but later comes clean about memories of the decade-old murder that she survived, which were triggered by her arrival at the crime scene and a trip to the morgue in which she saw the bodies of young women on the autopsy table.

Monroe was bitten by a snake that had escaped from a victim's automobile at a crime scene in episode 3.10 ("Sweet 16"). This plot development allowed a short-term hiatus for Anna Belknap, who was pregnant at the time.

In episode 3.14 ("The Lying Game") Monroe took a leave of absence to return to Montana, to testify for the state against a suspect arrested for the murder of her friends (the leave of absence coincided with Anna Belknap's real-life maternity leave from the show). She was shown in the witness box in episode 3.18 ("Sleight Out of Hand"), struggling to recount the events of the murder, when her co-worker Danny Messer entered the courtroom. Buoyed by his presence, she regained her composure and confidently gave testimony identifying the suspect as the gunman. Thanks in part to Lindsay's testimony, the suspect, Daniel Katums, was found guilty.

Monroe appears to enjoy the police work. She often makes enthusiastic, detailed explanations of her findings, sometimes including demonstrations. To Stella's amusement, these demonstrations often involve Mac's typically involuntary participation.

During the Season 7 premiere ("The 34th Floor"), Detective Taylor honored Monroe by awarding her a "Combat Cross" for shooting Shane Casey, which continued from the previous season's finale. The award caused Monroe to struggle from flashbacks of the shooting, which in turn causes her to storm out of her therapy session and throw her medal in the trash, after denying having felt anything remorseful or regretful from the shooting. After receiving a present in the mail from Stella, who had transferred to New Orleans, Monroe is comforted by Mac and Danny (who had retrieved her medal), assuring her that she deserved the award for saving her daughter's life.

Awards and decorations
The following are the medals and service awards fictionally worn by Detective Monroe-Messer, as seen in "The 34th Floor".

Relationships
Monroe quickly made friends of her colleagues after joining the CSI:NY force. Stella gave the new arrival some straight advice on living and working in the big city. Monroe seems to look up to Detective Mac Taylor as a mentor and father figure.

Danny Messer
Monroe's relationship with Danny Messer was a tumultuous one. Danny initially resented her, since she replaced Aiden Burn, his partner and best friend. When he met Monroe at the zoo on her first case, he told her to call Mac "Sir," to which the CSI supervisor takes offense. Soon after, Danny begins to call her "Montana," initially a pejorative, but it soon becomes a term of endearment, although he eventually stops calling her that. Danny is flirty to Lindsay in episode 2.13 (”Risk”) and also in episode 2.18 and 2.19.

Despite their rocky start, Danny and Lindsay become friends. In episode 2.21 ("All Access") she is troubled by Stella's injured situation, becoming frustrated during an interrogation and walking out of the room. Danny chased her down and convinced her to return.

Danny and Lindsay work several cases together. They also manage to see each other on other occasions during and outside of work. She invites him to a jazz club in episode 2.14 ("Stuck On You") so they can watch Mac playing bass with a group. In episode 2.16 ("Cool Hunter"), Lindsay seeks Danny's help in re-creating a crime scene by having him carry her through a garden. At the end of episode 2.15 ("Fare Game") Lindsay is the only team member who will partake of an insect-based banquet, causing Danny to lose a bet with Mac. When everyone else leaves to have pizza with Mac, Danny remains behind, to help her enjoy her "feast."

In episode 3.02 ("Not What It Looks Like") Danny's true feelings for Lindsay emerge; he protests when she volunteers to go undercover and embraces her after her near-fatal situation is defused. In the following episode ("Love Run Cold"), Danny had invited Lindsay on a real date but she did not show up. When Danny confronts her about the status of their relationship, she tells him that although she "likes him a lot," she cannot be in a relationship with him at the moment. Though disappointed, he still offers his support to her. Her reason for rebuffing him is later revealed to be the unresolved trauma which she still carried from the senseless murder of her friends which she witnessed as a teenager.

Because her withdrawal from Danny, their relationship for most of Season 3 is professional and strained. In episode 3.14 ("The Lying Game") she travels to Montana to testify against Daniel Katums, the man accused of murdering her friends and the waitress. Rather than say goodbye to Danny in person, she leaves him a card and signs it "Montana." In episode 3.18 ("Sleight Out Of Hand"), he unexpectedly shows up in the courtroom to lend her moral support during the trial. They sit with hands entwined when the verdict is read. Afterwards, he hugs her and she moves to kiss him, but the moment is interrupted by reporters.

In the third season finale, "Snow Day," they awaken on the pool table in Danny's apartment, wrapped in each other's arms. She eventually recalls how their evening of drinking and playing pool ended up with a lovemaking session on the pool table.

Although little screen time is initially devoted to the personal relationship between Danny and Lindsay in the fourth season, they were assumed to be dating. Midway through Season 4, a boy in Danny's neighborhood is killed during a neighborhood robbery. Blaming himself for the boy's death, Danny begins to push her away in grief, and falls into an affair with the boy's mother. Lindsay confronts him about pushing her away and is hurt when he is withdrawn and aloof. She tells him that she is not mad at him, but at herself for having fallen in love with him and that she will find a way to fall out of love with him. Danny later tries to apologize, but they are interrupted, called away on a case.

In episode 4.17 ("Like Water for Murder") an awkward moment between them causes her to leave a piece of evidence unattended. The investigator accrediting the lab notices this, and brings it to Mac's attention. Mac has words with Lindsay, and she verbalizes regret at having entered into a relationship with a coworker. In episode 4.19 ("Personal Foul") Danny calls her to apologize for pushing her away and he suggests that she come to his apartment. However, she merely says that she has to go, and hangs up the telephone.

The fifth season begins with Danny and Lindsay apparently still in a relationship, though some strain is evident. In episode 5.09 ("The Box"), after being caught coming out of an ob-gyn clinic, she reluctantly tells him that she is carrying his child; the producers had decided to work Anna Belknap's real-life pregnancy into the storyline. After struggling with how to deal with the revelation, especially after her remark that she "knows him" and does not expect anything of him, Danny stands by her and accepts his impending fatherhood. He proposes to her in the following episode, "The Triangle." Lindsay declines, later explaining that she is not refusing outright, but that she merely feels that it is the wrong time. She reminds him of the baby, and suggests taking baby steps. Agreeing, Danny tells her that he loves her, which she reciprocates. Together, they tell Mac about the pregnancy, and Mac congratulates them.

Subsequent episodes show Danny clearly wanting very much to be a part of the baby's life and her allowing him to be; on at least two occasions, he interacts with her expanding belly. In episode 5.17 ("Green Piece") she is planning a trip to Montana to see her family before the birth. With Mac, Danny discusses his relationship with Lindsay and their soon-to-arrive baby. At the end of the episode, Danny takes her to City Hall under the guise of meeting some friends. Outside the city clerk's office, he reiterates his feelings for her and says that he is the man she wants him to be. After she admits that he is, he again asks her to marry him. She agrees, and when the door to the clerk's office opens, she sees Mac and Stella, the friends that Danny was eager for her to meet. Mac and Stella then serve as witnesses to the marriage ceremony. During this portion of the episode, a montage of scenes is presented, ranging from the couple's first meeting in episode 2.3 ("Zoo York") up through episode 5.11 ("Forbidden Fruit)".

At the end of episode 5.19 ("Communication Breakdown") Lindsay, still in Montana, texts Danny that their baby is a girl. By episode 5.23 ("Greater Good") she has returned to the lab and goes into labor in the hallway. Adam takes her to the hospital, where, with Danny at her side, she gives birth to a girl. Though they initially disagree on the baby's name (Lindsay wants to name the baby "Lydia," but Danny prefers "Lucy"), they do agree that they want Mac to be the baby's godfather, which he accepts without hesitation. In episode 5.24 ("Grounds For Deception") they have apparently agreed that their daughter's name is Lucy, and have brought her to the lab, where their co-workers coo endlessly over her, including a male co-worker to whom Lucy responds positively, annoying the jealous father.

Danny is in a wheelchair in the season 6 premiere, having been shot while protecting Lindsay during a drive-by shooting at a bar at the end of season 5. Lindsay encourages him to not give up on recovery and assures him that she will stay with him, no matter what. Lindsay's faith that Danny will recover in spite of the odds, and his own desire to be a loving and attentive father to Lucy and devoted husband to Lindsay bolster his efforts, and by the end of episode 6.04 ("Dead Reckoning") Lindsay is overjoyed to find Danny in Lucy's nursery, holding Lucy and standing on his own.

In episode 9.13 ("Nine Thirteen") Lindsay reveals to Danny that she is pregnant with their second child.

Lindsay Monroe has been referred to as Lindsay Monroe-Messer or Lindsay Messer in episodes of CSI: NY from Season 7 onwards.

Family
Husband: Danny Messer
Daughter: Lucy Messer, born on-screen May 6, 2009 in episode 5.23 ("Greater Good")
Son: Not born by end of series, unnamed, mentioned as being a boy in episode 9.16 ("Blood Actually")
Father: Robert Monroe, appears in episode 9.08 ("Late Admissions")
Brother In-Law: Louie Messer

References

CSI: NY characters
Fictional New York City Police Department detectives
Fictional female scientists
Fictional characters from Montana
Fictional sole survivors
Television characters introduced in 2005